Pierre Roland (born Pierre Roland Christy; 14 April 1979 in Bengkulu, Indonesia) is an Indonesian actor.  He is known as Pierre Roland and is famous for his role as a super hero in a hit tv series "Gerhana" (RCTI,1999-2002). He has also appeared on films and other TV series as well as music videos, advertisements (magazines, television, billboards) and as TV presenter. His parents are of mixed Indonesian and European ancestry: father is English/Indonesian (Bengkulu) while his mother is Dutch/Indonesian (Javanese/Manadonese).

He is also a film producer with his first filmed produced by his own production house, Pilot Project Production, about a Balinese girl who lost her mother in the first Bali Bombing, titled "Angel's Cry".

Pierre Roland is currently in a few number of TV series in Indonesia, one of them is "Mimpi Manis", where he is acting alongside one of the most famous Indonesian Dangdut singers, Dewi Persik.

He is known to be one of the artists that do not like media exposure on his private life.

In the middle of July 2006, the public and media were shocked by the rumours that Pierre Roland was recently married. The wedding ceremony was a low profile one held at a church in Jakarta, attended only by family and friends. However, the information of the venue and time somehow leaked out on the day of the wedding day; causing the reporters to gather at the front of the church. At the end of event, the family and the guests managed to get the reporters mixed up (thinking that the bride and the groom had already left the venue). The wedding was said to be one of the very few unexposed weddings of Indonesian celebrities. A few days later, the couple finally made an official announcement in an interview by two Indonesian TV stations.

Pierre Roland's Indonesian-born Macau resident wife, Bonita Adela, gave birth to their first-born son, Olivier DeAngello Christy, at the Hospital Kiang Wu in Macau in 2007. Another son, Ezekiel Kramer Christy, was also born at the same hospital in Macau in 2010.

Trivia
 Pierre Roland is the nephew of high-profile Indonesian actor, Agus Melazt.
 Pierre Roland is a devout Christian.
 Pierre Roland's wife, whose family and relatives are mostly based in Macau, is the niece-in-law of former Indonesian actress Tjempaka Blanco (sister of Balinese painter Mario Blanco, and daughter of Spanish American turned Balinese painter Antonio Blanco with his Balinese wife Ni Ronji). She is of Mongolian, Chinese, Indonesian (Manadonese and Sundanese), and Dutch ancestry.

References

1979 births
Indo people
Indonesian people of Dutch descent
Indonesian people of English descent
Javanese people
Minahasa people
Indonesian Christians
Indonesian male film actors
Indonesian male television actors
Living people
People from Jakarta
Indonesian film producers